Remon de Vries (born 6 July 1979) is a Dutch former professional footballer who played as a midfielder.

Career
De Vries is a midfielder who was born in Apeldoorn and made his debut in professional football, being part of the AGOVV Apeldoorn squad in the 2003–04 season. At the end of that season he joined Heracles Almelo.

In the summer of 2009 he left Heracles on a free transfer and returned to AGOVV Apeldoorn on 14 September. He was released in June 2010 by his club AGOVV, and retired from professional football. He later signed as an amateur player with WHC Wezep.

References

1979 births
Living people
Dutch footballers
AGOVV Apeldoorn players
Heracles Almelo players
Eredivisie players
Eerste Divisie players
Sportspeople from Apeldoorn
Association football midfielders
WHC Wezep players
Footballers from Gelderland